The Albanian is a breed of cattle, originally from Albania. They are generally used as a draught animal and for dairy production.

Cattle breeds
Cattle breeds originating in Albania
Draught cattle breeds